La potranca is a 1960 Argentine-Mexican film directed by Román Viñoly Barreto.

Cast
  Mario Lozano
  Maruja Montes
  Guillermo Battaglia
  Rolando Chaves
  Néstor Deval
  Oscar Orlegui
  Roberto Blanco

External links
 

1960 films
Argentine drama films
Mexican drama films
1960s Spanish-language films
Films directed by Román Viñoly Barreto
1960s Argentine films